The discography of Joell Ortiz, an American rapper, consists of five studio albums, five singles and eight mixtapes.

Albums

Studio albums

Collaboration albums

EPs

Mixtapes

Singles

Guest appearances

References

Discographies of American artists
Hip hop discographies